Silvia Costa Acosta-Martínez (born May 4, 1964 in La Palma, Pinar del Río Province) is a former high jumper from Cuba.

Career
She is most known for winning medals at the 1985 IAAF World Indoor Championships and the 1993 World Championships in Athletics. She also has three medals from the Summer Universiade. She is also a three-time silver medallist at the Pan American Games.

Costa is married to Spanish citizen José Sanleandro.

International competitions

External links
 
 
 

1964 births
Living people
Cuban female high jumpers
Olympic athletes of Cuba
Athletes (track and field) at the 1992 Summer Olympics
Pan American Games silver medalists for Cuba
Pan American Games medalists in athletics (track and field)
Athletes (track and field) at the 1983 Pan American Games
Athletes (track and field) at the 1987 Pan American Games
Athletes (track and field) at the 1995 Pan American Games
Goodwill Games medalists in athletics
Universiade medalists in athletics (track and field)
World Athletics Championships athletes for Cuba
World Athletics Championships medalists
People from Pinar del Río Province
Universiade gold medalists for Cuba
Universiade silver medalists for Cuba
World Athletics Indoor Championships medalists
Medalists at the 1983 Summer Universiade
Medalists at the 1985 Summer Universiade
Medalists at the 1989 Summer Universiade
Competitors at the 1994 Goodwill Games
Medalists at the 1983 Pan American Games
Medalists at the 1987 Pan American Games
Medalists at the 1995 Pan American Games
Central American and Caribbean Games medalists in athletics
20th-century Cuban women
20th-century Cuban people